Carlos Augusto Cariño Medina (born October 21, 1977) is a Mexican football manager and former player. He was born in Mexico City.

He began his career at UNAM, where he played 75 games between 1995 and 2000. Later he would go to Santos Laguna where he played 232 games between 2000 and 2006. After his departure from Santos Laguna he played for Veracruz, Mérida, Tijuana, Atlante UTN, Neza and finally Pumas Morelos, he retired in 2013. During his football career he played as a midfielder.

In 2016 he began his career on the bench, when he was named assistant in the U-13 team of Club América. In 2018, he took charge of the UNAM Liga TDP team, later he would go on to lead various UNAM development teams.

In April 2022, Cariño was appointed interim manager of Pumas Tabasco, a team that plays in the Liga de Expansión MX. On May 19 he was confirmed in his position.

References 

1977 births
Living people
Association football midfielders
Mexican football managers
Footballers from Mexico City
Mexican footballers